Mehrababad may refer to:
 Mehrababad, Kohgiluyeh and Boyer-Ahmad
 Mehrababad, Sistan and Baluchestan